Homaloxestis aciformis is a moth in the family Lecithoceridae. It was described by Shu-Rong Liu and Shu-Xia Wang in 2014. It is found in Chongqing, China.

References

Moths described in 2014
Homaloxestis
Moths of Asia